Esther Garrel (born 18 February 1991) is a French actress. She is most known for her roles in 17 Girls (2011), Jealousy (2013), Call Me by Your Name (2017), and Thirst Street (2017).

Early life
Garrel was born in Paris, the daughter of filmmaker Philippe Garrel and actress Brigitte Sy. Her brother is actor Louis Garrel, and her grandfather is actor Maurice Garrel. Her maternal grandfather was of Sephardic Jewish descent.

Career
Garrel made her film debut in Wild Innocence, directed by her father. She went on to star in 17 Girls, directed by Delphine and Muriel Coulin, which had its world premiere at the 2011 Cannes Film Festival, as well as Youth, directed by Justine Malle. In 2013 Garrel starred alongside her brother in Jealousy, directed by her father.

In 2017, Garrel co-starred in Call Me by Your Name, directed by Luca Guadagnino, opposite Timothée Chalamet, Armie Hammer, and Michael Stuhlbarg. It had its world premiere at the 2017 Sundance Film Festival. She went on to star in Thirst Street, directed by Nathan Silver, which had its world premiere at the Tribeca Film Festival on 21 April 2017,  and Lover for a Day, directed by her father, and which had its world premiere at the Cannes Film Festival in May 2017.

Filmography

References

External links
 

Living people
1991 births
21st-century French actresses
French film actresses
French child actresses
Jewish French actresses
Actresses from Paris
21st-century French Sephardi Jews